The Puppy Derby is a greyhound competition held at Towcester Greyhound Stadium.

The event was held at Wimbledon Stadium from 1929 to 2016, until the closure of the stadium in 2017.

Other Puppy Derby races have been created by other race tracks including the Midland Puppy Derby and despite some of these races matching or surpassing the original Puppy Derby for prize money at certain times they do not carry the same prestige.

In 2017 the race switched from Wimbledon and the GRA to Towcester and the prize money increased to £20,000 to the winner, bringing the race back to its former glory When it switched to Towcester in 2017 it was only held for one year because the track closed and the event was switched to Henlow. It then reverted to sister track Towcester in 2020, when it re-opened under promoter Kevin Boothby. The 2022 edition was not held due to problems with the weather and rescheduling.

Venue & Distances
1929–1974 (Wimbledon 500 yards) 
1975–2009 (Wimbledon 460 metres)
2010–2016 (Wimbledon 480 metres)
2017–2017 (Towcester 480 metres)
2018–2019 (Henlow 460 metres)
2020–present (Towcester 500 metres)

Winning Trainers
 Jack Harvey 4
 Nick/Natalie Savva 4

Past winners

Sponsors
1989–1989 (Truman's Brewery)
1990–1990 (Foster's Lager)
1991–1991 (Wey Plastics)
1994–1994 (Surrey Racing)
2001–2006 (William Hill)
2007–2007 (Holsten Pils)
2008–2009 (Stan James)
2010–2012 (William Hill)
2013–2016 (RFS)
2017–2017 (ECC Timber)
2018–2018 (Gain Nutrition)
2020–2020 (Star Sports)
2021–present (Racing Post GTV)

References

Greyhound racing competitions in the United Kingdom
Recurring sporting events established in 1929
Sport in Northamptonshire
Greyhound racing in London